Hammonton is a train station in Hammonton, New Jersey, United States. It serves NJ Transit trains on the Atlantic City Line, local buses, and the Amtrak Thruway Motorcoach.  Its Amtrak station code is HTN.  Eastbound service is offered to Atlantic City and Westbound service is offered to Philadelphia. The station is located at Egg Harbor Road and Line Street.

The station is located just two blocks from downtown Hammonton, and is connected by a cement walking path that traverses a town park. Along this route is the New Jersey Transit Hammonton Crew Quarters building.

Station layout

References

External links

Amtrak station detail

Hammonton, New Jersey
NJ Transit Rail Operations stations
Railway stations in Atlantic County, New Jersey
Amtrak Thruway Motorcoach stations in New Jersey
Railway stations in the United States opened in 1854
1854 establishments in New Jersey